Tau Centauri, Latinized from τ Centauri, is a solitary star in the southern constellation of Centaurus. It is visible to the naked eye with an apparent visual magnitude of +3.86. The distance to this star, based upon an annual parallax shift of 24.85 mas, is 131 light years.

This is an A-type star with stellar classifications of A0 V or A1 IVnn, indicating it may be a main sequence star or a more evolved subgiant star. It is around 132 million years old and is spinning rapidly with a projected rotational velocity of 296.8 km/s. This is giving the star an oblate shape, with an estimated equatorial girth that is 30% larger than the polar radius. The star has an estimated 2.3 times the mass of the Sun and 2.2 times the Sun's radius.

References

A-type main-sequence stars
Centaurus (constellation)
Centauri, Tau
Durchmusterung objects
109787
061622
4802